Igor Matheus Liziero Pereira (born 7 February 1998), known as Liziero, is a Brazilian professional footballer who plays as central midfielder for Coritiba Foot Ball Club, on loan from São Paulo.

Career

São Paulo
Liziero made his debut in the senior team March 11, 2018. After three games coming off the bench, Liziero got into the starting XI on 20 March 2018 against São Caetano.

Career statistics
(Correct )

Honours
São Paulo
Campeonato Paulista: 2021

References

1998 births
Living people
Brazilian footballers
Association football midfielders
Campeonato Brasileiro Série A players
São Paulo FC players
Sport Club Internacional players
Coritiba Foot Ball Club players
People from Jales